= Stephanie Lampkin =

American software engineer and entrepreneur

Stephanie Lampkin is an American software engineer and entrepreneur.

== Early life and education ==
Lampkin learned to code when she was 13 years old and was a full-stack web developer at age 15. Lampkin credits her aunt, who was a computer scientist and programmer herself, with contributing to her own success. Lampkin earned an engineering degree at Stanford University and a master's in business administration from MIT.

== Career ==
Lampkin has worked at Microsoft, Deloitte, Lockheed, and TripAdvisor as well as multiple startups. Lampkin is currently vice chair of Fair Pay workplace. She also founded Visible Figures, a community of Black women backed by venture capital.

She is the founder and former CEO of Blendoor, an app that aims to remove bias from hiring by anonymizing profiles of applicants until the interview stage. Lampkin created Blendoor after she declined a job offer from a large tech company. She applied for the analytics position, but ended up with an offer in the sales department.

Lampkin created Blendoor to reduce bias in hiring by where job seekers can upload resumes, hiding their age, gender and race. Lampkin’s goal in creating Blendoor was to help women and people of different races receive equal opportunities while pursuing jobs.

Blendoor also offers BlendScore, a scoring system for corporate DEI, which provides information of diversity data of top rank companies shared to job seekers.
